John Antonio Santander Plaza (born 15 May 1994) is a Chilean footballer who currently plays for Deportes Recoleta as left back.

Career
He debuted on 9 September 2012 in a match against Santiago Wanderers for the 2012 Copa Chile. He played his first league match on 7 October in a match against Antofagasta

References

External links
 

Living people
1994 births
People from Limarí Province
Chilean footballers
Chilean Primera División players
Primera B de Chile players
Universidad de Chile footballers
Deportes La Serena footballers
A.C. Barnechea footballers
C.D. Huachipato footballers
San Luis de Quillota footballers
Deportes Temuco footballers
Cobresal footballers
Deportes Iquique footballers
Deportes Recoleta footballers
Association football fullbacks